The men's individual rings competition of the 2014 Commonwealth Games took place on July 31 at the SSE Hydro arena in Glasgow, Scotland.

Results

Qualification

Qualification took place on July 28 as part of the team and individual qualification event.

Final

References

External links
Official results

Gymnastics at the 2014 Commonwealth Games